Terror Trail may refer to:

 Terror Trail (1921 film)
 Terror Trail (1933 film)
 Terror Trail (1946 film), directed by Ray Nazarro